Helge Marcus Ingstad (30 December 1899 – 29 March 2001) was a Norwegian explorer. In 1960, after mapping some Norse settlements, Ingstad and his wife archaeologist Anne Stine Ingstad found remnants of a Viking settlement in L'Anse aux Meadows in the province of Newfoundland in Canada. They were thus the first to prove conclusively that the Icelandic/Greenlandic Norsemen such as Leif Erickson had found a way across the Atlantic Ocean to North America, roughly 500 years before Christopher Columbus and John Cabot. He also thought that the mysterious disappearance of the Greenland Norse Settlements in the 14th and 15th centuries could be explained by their emigration to North America.

Helge Ingstad died at Diakonhjemmet Hospital in Oslo at the age of 101.

Early life 
Helge Ingstad was the son of Olav Ingstad  (1867–1958) and Olga Marie Qvam (1869–1946) in Meråker, Nord-Trøndelag. His father was municipal engineer in Tromsø and held the title of factory supervisor. He was the grandson of lawyer professor, Marcus Pløen Ingstad. Helge and his family moved to Bergen in 1915 where he attended the Bergen Katedralskole (1915–1918), and after graduating cand. jur. in 1922 he took up a practice of lawyer in Levanger.

Career 

Helge Ingstad was originally a lawyer by profession, but, ever an outdoorsman, he sold his successful law practice in Levanger and went to Canada's Northwest Territories as a trapper in 1926. For the next three years, the Norwegian travelled with the local Indian tribe known as the Caribou Eaters. After returning to Norway, he wrote the bestselling Pelsjegerliv ("Trapper Life") about his time in Canada, published in English as The Land of Feast and Famine (Knopf, 1933).

Ingstad was the governor (Sysselmann) of Erik the Red's Land in 1932–1933, when Norway annexed that eastern part of Greenland. The Permanent Court of International Justice in The Hague decided that the lands belonged to Denmark, and so the official Norwegian presence had to end. Following the verdict, Ingstad was summoned by the government to the job as governor of Svalbard (Spitsbergen and the surrounding islands) — a position suiting him uniquely, considering his profession of law and his experience in Arctic living.

Marriage 
During his years on Svalbard, Helge Ingstad met Anne Stine Moe, nearly twenty years his junior. She had read his books from Canada and Greenland with great admiration, and developed a crush on the explorer; she wrote to him, and after some time of correspondence and dating they were engaged, and married in 1941. In 1946, the Ingstads made themselves a home near the Holmenkollen area of Norway's capital, Oslo, where they spent the rest of their lives when not travelling the world. They had one daughter, Benedicte, who became a professor in medical anthropology at the University in Oslo. From her teenage years, Benedicte accompanied her parents on their exploration journeys.

Author 
Helge Ingstad was a popular author, whose books on his visits to remote parts of the world gained him fame in Norway. From Greenland he wrote Øst for den store bre ("East of the Great Glacier"), from Svalbard he wrote Landet med de kalde kyster ("The Land With the Chilly Coasts"). He also visited the Apache Indians of northwestern Mexico, from which he wrote Apache-indianerne - jakten på den tapte stamme ("The Apaches - The Hunt for the Lost Tribe"). After World War II he stayed for a period in the Brooks Range in northern Alaska among the Nunamiut Iñupiat, and afterwards wrote Nunamiut - blant Alaskas innlandseskimoer ("Nunamiut - Inland Eskimos of Alaska").

His 1931 book, The Land of Feast or Famine, was republished by McGill University Press, in 1992, after being out of print for over forty years.

Viking settlement of North America 

In 1960, he discovered the remains of what later proved to be a Viking settlement at L'Anse aux Meadows at the northernmost tip of Newfoundland in Canada.
It is the only known site of a Norse or Viking village in Canada, and in North America outside of Greenland. Dating to around the year 1000, L'Anse aux Meadows remains the only widely accepted instance of pre-Columbian trans-oceanic contact and is notable for its possible connection with the attempted colony of Vinland established by Leif Ericson around the same time period or, more broadly, with Norse exploration of the Americas.

Archaeological excavation at the site was conducted in the 1960s by an international team led by archaeologist Anne Stine Ingstad (Helge Ingstad's wife) and under the direction of Parks Canada of the Government of Canada in the 1970s. Following each period of excavation, the site was reburied to protect and conserve the cultural resources.

The settlement at L'Anse aux Meadows has been dated to approximately 1,000 years ago, an assessment that tallies with the relative dating of artifact and structure types. The remains of eight buildings were located. They are believed to have been constructed of sod placed over a wooden frame. Based on associated artifacts, the buildings were variously identified as dwellings or workshops. The largest dwelling measured  and consisted of several rooms. Workshops were identified as an iron smithy containing a forge and iron slag, a carpentry workshop, which generated wood debris, and a specialized boat repair area containing worn rivets. Besides those related to iron working, carpentry, and boat repair, other artifacts found at the site consisted of common everyday Norse items, including a stone oil lamp, a whetstone, a bronze fastening pin, a bone knitting needle, and part of a spindle. The presence of the spindle and needle suggests that women were present as well as men. Food remains included butternuts, which are significant because they do not grow naturally north of New Brunswick, and their presence probably indicates the Norse inhabitants travelled farther south to obtain them. Archaeologists concluded that the site was inhabited by the Norse for a relatively short period of time.

Named features 
Helge Ingstad has two geographic features in North America named after him. In Canada, a small river, Ingstad Creek, flows into Great Slave Lake. In Alaska, the 1461-meter-high Ingstad Mountain in the Brooks Range was officially approved by the U.S. Board on Geographic Names on 19 April 2006. The name was suggested by the Nunamiut tribe in gratitude for Ingstad's efforts on their behalf.

During the last few years of his life, he worked on categorizing and annotating the large quantity of photos and audio recordings (141 songs) he had made while living with the Nunamiut in 1950. The effort resulted in a booklet, Songs of the Nunamiut, with an accompanying CD containing the audio material. This is an extremely valuable contribution to the preservation of the Nunamiut culture, because it turned out that much of what he had gathered in the mid-20th century was now lost locally and was only preserved in his recordings.

Honours 
He was an honorary member of the Norwegian Academy of Science and Letters. He also held honorary doctorates at the University of Oslo, Memorial University of Newfoundland in Canada, and at St. Olaf College in Minnesota. He was awarded the Grand Cross of the Royal Norwegian Order of St. Olav (in 1991; previously Knight 1st class in 1965, and Commander in 1970), Knight of the Order of Vasa, and he was presented with the Norwegian Red Cross Badge of Honour for his efforts in Finnmark during World War II. He received a lifetime government grant from the Norwegian government from 1970. He was the subject of a 1981 National Film Board of Canada (NFB) documentary The Man Who Discovered America, and subsequently appeared along with his wife in the 1984 NFB film, The Vinland Mystery. In 1986, he was presented Arts Council Norway's honor award. , the fourth of the five s of the Royal Norwegian Navy was named after Helge Ingstad.

The inner main-belt asteroid 8993 Ingstad, discovered by Danish astronomer Richard Martin West at ESO's La Silla Observatory in Chile in 1980, was named in his memory. The official naming citation was published by the MPC on 24 June 2002.

The Helge and Anne Stine Ingstad Building on the St. John's Campus of Memorial University is named after him and his wife. It houses the University's Print and Mail Services.

Books 
 Ingstad, Helge; Gay-Tifft, Eugene (translator) (1992). The Land of Feast and Famine. McGill-Queens University Press. .
 Ingstad, Helge; Naomi Walford (translator) (1966). Land under the Pole Star; a voyage to the Norse settlements of Greenland and the saga of the people that vanished. St. Martins Press.
 Ingstad, Helge (1996). Oppdagelsen av det nye land. J. M. Stenersens forlag (Oslo).
 Ingstad, Helge; Ingstad, Anne Stine (2001). The Viking Discovery of America: The Excavation of a Norse Settlement in L'Anse Aux Meadows, Newfoundland. Checkmark Books. New York. .
 Ingstad, Helge; Groven, Eivind (transcriptions); Tveit, Sigvald (ed.) (1998). Songs of the Nunamiut. Oslo: Universitetsforlaget. .
 Ingstad, Helge (1965). Vesterveg til Vinland; oppdagelsen av norrøne boplasser i Nord-Amerika. Gyldendal (Oslo).
 Ingstad, Helge (1954) Nunamiut; Among Alaska's Inland Eskimos New York: W.W. Norton
 Ingstad, Helge (1939) Apache Indianerne - Jakten på den tapte stamme (translated by Janine K. Stenehjem  (2004) Apaches - the search for the lost tribe University of Nebraska Press)
 Ingstad, Helge; (1935) Ost For Den Store Bre   Gyldendal Norsk Forlag, Oslo. (translated by Gay-Tifft, Eugene (1937)  East of the Great Glacier Alfred A Knopf, Inc.)

Articles
 Ingstad, Helge. "Vinland Ruins Prove Vikings Found the New World." National Geographic, November 1964. Microsoft Encarta 2009. © 1993–2008 Microsoft Corporation. All rights reserved.

See also 

 Norse colonization of North America

References

External links 
Obituary from the New York Times as it appeared in the Halifax Sunday Herald, April 1, 2001(note that the name of Ingstad's wife, Anne Stine, is misspelled, twice, differently, in this otherwise well-written obituary)
Concise obituary from Memorial University of Newfoundland Gazette, April 12, 2001
The Norse discovery of America – PubMed abstract of article about the L'Anse Aux Meadows finds
Family genealogy

1899 births
2001 deaths
Governors of Svalbard
Knights of the Order of Vasa
Men centenarians
Members of the Norwegian Academy of Science and Letters
Academic staff of the Memorial University of Newfoundland
Norwegian centenarians
Norwegian expatriates in Canada
Norwegian explorers
Norwegian hunters
20th-century Norwegian lawyers
People educated at the Bergen Cathedral School
People from Meråker
Viking Age in Canada
Academic staff of the University of Oslo